Jazero (literally: "The lake") is a reservoir, which was created in the second half of the 20th century, located in the Nad jazerom borough (city ward) of Košice, Slovakia.

Characteristics
Jazero is the dominant feature of this part of the city and is set in the recreational area with the same name. This recreational area includes a cable skiing system, a boat rental provider, a sandy beach, multifunctional playgrounds, children's and full-size volleyball courts, and a number of catering facilities that are open to visitors during the summer. If the water is of good quality, you can bathe in it. During the swimming season, a lifeguard and rescue service is available. Between the lake and the river Hornad, there is a wooded area with footpaths and Fire pits for grilling as well as a cycle path for cycling and rollerblading. Fishing in allowed, provided that a license has been purchased.

The cable skiing system, operated by Trixen, is used for both competition and recreational water skiing.

Košické Benátky (literally: "Kosice Venice") is an annual event in which non-traditional sailing vessels are presented upon the lake.

References 

 

Reservoirs in Slovakia